Direct materials cost  the cost of direct materials which can be easily identified with the unit of production. For example, the cost of glass is a direct materials cost in light bulb manufacturing.

The manufacture of products or goods required material as the prime element. In general, these materials are divided into two categories. These categories are direct materials and indirect materials.

Direct materials are also called productive materials, raw materials, raw stock, stores and only materials without any descriptive title.

Direct materials cost estimation 

Steps to estimate the direct material costs:
Find the total amount to be produced. This is usually noted as the order size.
Calculate the total amount of raw materials required to produce the order size.
Multiply that amount by the cost associated with the raw materials.
If there is a waste or scrap, its cost should be added to the costs in step 3.
If the waste or scrap can be sold at salvage value, this value should be subtracted from the costs in step 4.

See also
Variance analysis (accounting)
Direct material total variance
Direct material price variance
Direct material usage variance

References 

Costs